Morum petestimpsoni is a species of sea snail, a marine gastropod mollusk, in the family Harpidae.

Description
The length of the shell attains 61.2 mm.

Distribution
This species occurs in Vietnam.

References

petestimpsoni
Gastropods described in 2017